The 1899 Army Cadets football team represented the United States Military Academy in the 1899 college football season. In their third season under head coach Herman Koehler, the Cadets compiled a 4–5 record and were outscored by their opponents by a combined total of 100 to 57.  In the annual Army–Navy Game, the Cadets defeated the Navy by a 17 to 5 score.

Schedule

References

Army
Army Black Knights football seasons
Army Cadets football